Tatar, Azerbaijan may refer to:
Tatar, Jabrayil
Tatar, Qubadli
Tatar, Zangilan